The term value presentation denotes the purposive and recipient specific conveyance of information or data by means of modern, multimedia-based demonstration techniques (Argote & Ingram 2000: pp. 11). To achieve this goal multimedia-supported lecture (PowerPoint Presentation) as well as short animations, real videoclips (training course clips) or a series of charts may be utilized. Knowledge transmission via value presentations is equally applied in business or economical and commercial or marketing domains (Tufte 2006: pp. 5).

See also 

Marketing
Marketing communications
Microsoft PowerPoint
PowerPoint animation
Knowledge visualization
Lecture

References 

Argote, L. & Ingram, P. (2000):"Knowledge transfer:A Basis for Competitive Advantage in Firms".Organizational Behavior and Human Decision Processes 82.
Kotler, Ph. & Keller, K. L. (2009):"A Framework for Marketing Management (4th ed.)". Pearson Prentice Hall..
Tufte, E.R. (2006):"The Cognitive Style of PowerPoint:Pitching Out Corrupts Within."Cheshire, Connecticut:Graphics Press, 2nd edition.

Presentation